Montesclaros High School is located in the town of Cerceda, Madrid, a region in the middle of Spain.

The School was founded in 1980. The institution is divided into two buildings, one is devoted to Vocational studies and the other is subdivided into two wings. The first wing is used for Compulsory Secondary Education and the second for Higher Secondary Education.

There are many activities to do throughout the year, such as visits to interesting places from an educational point of view, leisure trips, sport competitions.

Cerceda is the main town, and some of the students attend the School but many other students come from neighbouring villages.

References

Educational institutions established in 1980
Secondary schools in Spain
1980 establishments in Spain